Countess of Mornington is a title given to the wife of the Earl of Mornington. Women who have held the title include:

Katherine Wellesley-Pole, Countess of Mornington (c.1760-1851)
Hyacinthe-Gabrielle Roland (1766-1816)
Elizabeth Wellesley, Duchess of Wellington (1820-1904)
Diana Wellesley, Duchess of Wellington (1922-2010)
Jemma Wellesley, Marchioness of Douro (born 1974)